Tiago Manuel Maio Matos (born 22 January 2001) is a Portuguese professional footballer who plays as a right-back or defensive midfielder for Slovak club Tatran Prešov, on loan from Radomiak Radom.

Honours
Porto Youth
UEFA Youth League: 2018–19

References

External links

2001 births
Living people
Footballers from Porto
Portuguese footballers
Association football defenders
Association football midfielders
Portugal youth international footballers
Liga Portugal 2 players
Ekstraklasa players

FC Porto B players
Radomiak Radom players
1. FC Tatran Prešov players
Portuguese expatriate footballers
Expatriate footballers in Poland
Expatriate footballers in Slovakia
Portuguese expatriate sportspeople in Poland
Portuguese expatriate sportspeople in Slovakia